Vitta glabrata is a species of brackish water snail, a gastropod mollusk in the family Neritidae.

Description
The length of the shell is 8.5 mm.

Distribution
This species occurs in Africa from Gambia to Angola.

References

 Eichhorst T.E. (2016). Neritidae of the world. Volume 2. Harxheim: Conchbooks. Pp. 696-1366

External links
 Sowerby, G. B., II. (1849). Monograph of the genus Neritina. In G. B. Sowerby II (ed.), Thesaurus conchyliorum, or monographs of genera of shells. Vol. 2 (10): 507-546, pls. 109–116. London, privately published.

Neritidae
Gastropods described in 1849